Calicut Heroes is a men's volleyball team from Kozhikode, Kerala playing in the Prime Volleyball League in India. The team was founded in 2018 and owned by Beacon Sports. The team had participated in the only season of the dissolved Pro Volleyball League in 2019 before it switched to Prime Volleyball League in 2021.

Honors
 Pro Volleyball League
 Runners-up: 2019

 Prime Volleyball League
 Fourth Place: 2022

History

2019 season
In mid-2018, Baseline Ventures, India invited bids for franchisees based in Indian cities for Pro Volleyball League. The league was given the go-ahead by Fédération Internationale de Volleyball. Beacon Sports won the bid for the Calicut franchisee in the Pro Volleyball League. The Calicut Heroes team was captained by Jerome Vinith and coached by Sajad Hussain Malik in the Pro Volleyball League.

Team

Current team

Administration and support staff

References 

Volleyball in India
Sports teams in India
Men's volleyball teams